Berberian or Berberyan is an Armenian surname. Notable people with the surname include:

Alain Berberian (1953-2017), French film director and writer
Ara Berberian (1930–2005), American bass singer
Cathy Berberian (1925–1983), American mezzo-soprano and composer
Charles Berberian (born 1959), French cartoonist, illustrator and writer
Hampartzoum Berberian (1905-1999), Armenian composer and conductor
John Berberian (born 1941), American musician playing the oud
Martin Berberyan (born 1980), Armenian Freestyle wrestler 
Reteos Berberian (1848–1907), Armenian educator, pedagogue, principal, writer, poet
Schahan Berberian (1891–1956), composer, son of Reteos Berberian
Viken Berberian (born 1966), writer
Vahe Berberian, Armenian American comedian

Other
Berberian School, a school in Constantinople, founded by Reteos Berberian
Berberian Sound Studio, a 2012 British horror film

Armenian-language surnames